The Nile perch (Lates niloticus), also known as the African snook, Goliath perch, African barramundi , Goliath barramundi, Giant lates or the Victoria perch, is a species of freshwater fish in family Latidae of order Perciformes. It is widespread throughout much of the Afrotropical realm, being native to the Congo, Nile, Senegal, Niger and Lake Chad, Volta, Lake Turkana, and other river basins. It also occurs in the brackish waters of Lake Maryut in Egypt. The Nile perch is a fish of substantial economic and food-security importance in East Africa. Originally described as Labrus niloticus, among the marine wrasses, the species has also been referred to as Centropomus niloticus. Common names include African snook, Victoria perch (a misleading trade name, as the species is not native to Lake Victoria, though they have been introduced there), and many local names in various African languages, such as the Luo name mbuta or mputa. In Tanzania, it is called sangara, sankara, or chenku. In Francophone African countries, it is known as capitaine. Its name in the Hausa language is giwan ruwa, meaning "water elephant".

Description
L. niloticus is silver in color with a blue tinge. It has distinctive dark-black eyes, with a bright-yellow outer ring.

Adult Nile perch occupy all habitats of a lake with sufficient oxygen concentrations, while juveniles are restricted to shallow or nearshore environments. A fierce predator that dominates its surroundings, the Nile perch feeds on fish (including its own species), crustaceans, molluscs, and insects; the juveniles also feed on zooplankton. Nile perch use schooling as a mechanism to protect themselves from other predators.

Invasive species
Nile perch have been introduced to many other lakes in Africa, including Lake Victoria   and the artificial Lake Nasser. The World Conservation Union's Invasive Species Specialist Group considers L. niloticus one of the world's 100 worst invasive species.

The species is of great commercial importance as a food fish. The Nile perch is also popular with sport anglers, as it attacks artificial fishing lures, and it is also raised in aquaculture.

Lake Victoria introduction

The introduction of this species to Lake Victoria is one of the most cited examples of the negative effects alien species can have on ecosystems.

The Nile perch was introduced to Lake Victoria in East Africa in the 1950s, and has since been fished commercially. In 2003, Nile perch sales to the EU reached 169 million euros. Sport-fishing in the region of Uganda and Tanzania provided additional income from tourism.

Its introduction was ecologically disruptive and is attributed with causing the extinction or near-extinction of several hundred native species, with some populations fluctuating with commercial fishing and the actual Nile perch stocks. The Nile perch initially fed on native cichlids, but with decreasing availability of this prey, it now consumes mainly small shrimp and minnows.

The alteration of the native ecosystem had disruptive socioeconomic effects on local communities bordering the lake. Many local people have been displaced from their traditional occupations in the fishing trade and brought them into the cash economy, or before the establishment of export-oriented fisheries, turned them into economic refugees. At least initially, nets strong enough to hold adult Nile perch could not be manufactured locally and had to be imported for a high price.

The introduction of Nile perch has also had additional ecological effects on shore. Native cichlids were traditionally sun-dried, but because Nile perch have a high fat content (higher than cichlids), they need to be smoked to avoid spoiling. This has led to an increased demand for firewood in a region already hard-hit by deforestation, soil erosion, and desertification.

The Academy Award-nominated documentary Darwin's Nightmare by Hubert Sauper (a French-Austrian-Belgian production, 2004) deals with the damage that has been caused by Nile perch introduction, including the import of weapons and ammunition in cargo planes from Europe, which are then used to export Nile perch, further exacerbating conflict and misery in the surrounding regions.

Regardless of whether it is considered positive or negative, the trophic web of Lake Victoria appears to have been drastically impoverished by the introduction of this novel near-top-level predator. While the ecosystem seems to be moving towards a new equilibrium, neither its former state nor the state of fisheries on Lake Victoria can ever easily be brought back.

Fishing
On Lake Victoria, the only (small) trawlers present belong to research institutes. Small-scale fishing boats are propelled mostly by sails, and paddles are used on the smallest boats. However, the number of boats propelled by outboard engines is on the rise, denoting a greater capital intensity of the local Nile perch fishery. One to three fishermen use a boat. The fish are caught mainly with gill nets and hand lines and sometimes (short) long lines. Those caught by gill nets are usually dead when the nets are lifted. The fish are kept in the boat without protection or ice and taken to landing sites, mostly beaches, where they are weighed and purchased by company buyers using insulated boats or vans with ice, or the fish are bought by local women.

The fishery also generates indirect employment for additional fish processors, transporters, factory employees, and others. All along the lakeshore, 'boom towns' have developed in response to the demands of fishing crews with money to spend from a day's fishing. These towns resemble shanties, and have little in the way of services. Of the 1,433 landing sites identified in the 2004 frame survey, just 20% had communal lavatory facilities, 4% were served by electricity, and 6% were served by a potable water supply.

Threats
Despite being a successful invasive species, the fish faces threats. Being a species of megafauna, the most obvious threats to the species are overfishing and the use of illegal fishing gear, as well as invasive water hyacinths. Prey depletion is also a factor, as it decreases the size of the fish and makes it vulnerable to larger predators, such as crocodiles.

Export
In 2021, The Uganda Fish Processors and Exporters Association called on the parliament to ban the local consumption of the species so as to protect its export.

See also 
 Nile tilapia — a similar-named but different fish that is much smaller and mostly feeds on plant matter

Notes

References

Further reading
 Beuving, J. J. 2010. "Playing pool along the shores of Lake Victoria. Fishermen, careers and capital accumulation in the Ugandan Nile perch business" Africa: Journal of the International African Institute 80 (2): 224–248.
 Beuving, J. J. 2013. "Chequered Fortunes in Global Exports: The Sociogenesis of African Entrepreneurship in the Nile Perch Business at Lake Victoria, Uganda" 
 Pringle, R.M. 2005. "The origins of the Nile perch in Lake Victoria." BioScience 55:780-787. 
 Pringle, R.M. 2005. "The Nile Perch in Lake Victoria: local responses and adaptations." Africa 75:510-538. 
Masciarelli, Alex. "The rise and fall of the Nile Perch." March 15, 2007. 
 Socio-economic effects of the evolution of Nile perch fisheries in Lake Victoria: a review. J. Eric Reynolds and D.F. Greboval, CIFA Technical paper 17, FAO 1988,  (online version)
 M.L. Bianchini (1995). Species introductions in the aquatic environment: changes in biodiversity and economics of exploitation. Proc. World Fish. Congress (Athens, 1992), 3: 213–222.

External links

 
 
 Lipton, David. "Lates niloticus: Information". Animal Diversity Web. Ann Arbor: University of Michigan Museum of Zoology, 2003.
 Snoeks, Jos. "Ecology of Lates niloticus". Global Invasive Species Database. Updated 22 September 2004.
 IUCN. "Alien Species Invade the Planet". Press release, 11 May 2001.
 Species Profile - Nile Perch (Lates niloticus), National Invasive Species Information Center, United States National Agricultural Library.

Nile perch
Afrotropical realm fauna
Freshwater fish of West Africa
Fish of Chad
Fish of Egypt
Freshwater fish of Kenya
Fish of Sudan
Fish of the Democratic Republic of the Congo
Fish of the Republic of the Congo
Freshwater fish of Tanzania
Freshwater fish of Uganda
Fish of Lake Turkana
Congo River
Nile
Nile basin
Nile perch
Taxa named by Carl Linnaeus